The Rajang Mangroves National Park is a national park in Sarikei Division, Sarawak, Malaysia.
It is home to species such as proboscis monkeys, silvered langurs, lesser adjutant storks and hornbills.

It has a very important role in preserving the coast, from the occurrence of erosion, tidal floods and salt intrusions.

See also
 List of national parks of Malaysia

External links
 Treasure our Rajang mangroves - WWF Malaysia

References 

National parks of Sarawak
Sunda Shelf mangroves